Siddharth Koirala is a Nepalese film actor, and the younger brother of Bollywood actress of Nepali origin, Manisha Koirala, best known for playing the lead in Manish Jha's Indian film Anwar (2006).

Family
Siddharth Koirala was born into the Nepalese political family of Koiralas in Kathmandu, Nepal. His grandfather, Bishweshwar Prasad Koirala was the Prime Minister of Nepal in the late 1950s to early 1960s. His great-uncles Matrika Prasad Koirala and Girija Prasad Koirala also served terms as Nepal's prime ministers. In January 2008, Siddharth married his longtime girlfriend.

Career

Siddharth entered Indian cinema as a co-producer with his sister for the comedy film Paisa Vasool (2004), which also starred his sister Manisha. He also collaborated as a writer for a US television documentary entitled Terrorism: Bio Attack (2005). His acting debut was in the poorly received Fun: Can Be Dangerous Sometimes (2005).

A more serious role was his second venture in the critically acclaimed Anwar (2007), which also did poorly at the box office. Siddharth took a long break and made a comeback in the directorial debut of Rahat Kazmi, the dark comedy film Dekh Bhai Dekh (2009), which opened to mild responses. He was seen then in a film about the 26 November 2008 Mumbai attacks project entitled Deshdrohi-2, directed by Kamaal R. Khan in 2009.

Filmography

References

External links
 

Male actors in Hindi cinema
Living people
Nepalese male film actors
21st-century Nepalese male actors
Actors from Kathmandu
S
Year of birth missing (living people)
Nepalese expatriates in India